Thalia's shrew (Crocidura thalia) is a species of mammal in the family Soricidae. It is endemic to Ethiopia. The mammal's natural habitats are subtropical or tropical moist montane forests and high-elevation grasslands, and moist savanna.

References
 Lavrenchenko, L. 2004.  Crocidura thalia.   2006 IUCN Red List of Threatened Species.   Downloaded on 30 July 2007.

Thalia's shrew
Endemic fauna of Ethiopia
Mammals of Ethiopia
Fauna of the Ethiopian Highlands
Thalia's shrew
Taxonomy articles created by Polbot